Kirkop is a village in the Southern Region of Malta. It is found near the Malta International Airport, and has been inhabited since pre-history. The parish church is dedicated to Saint Leonard. The football team of the village is the Kirkop United Football Club.

Etymology and population

The original name of the village was Casal Prokopju, and is retrieved from the registers of the Maltese militia that existed prior to the rule of the Order of St. John. Through generations, the local population corrupted the original name and was changed to Kirkop.

The name of the village comes from the surname of a rich family

History

Punic remains of catacombs are found around the village of Kirkop with some of them remain unexplored, and their exploration has been shelved.

In 1969 Anthropologist Jeremy Boissevain published a research on the social fabric of the village in his book Hal Farrug: a village in Malta. Boissevain claims that the people of Ħal Kirkop have lived in the area for centuries because of his assumed comparable bloodline with ancient Phoenician.  The Phoenicians occupied the Maltese islands around 700 B.C..

Kirkop was part of a larger community, as part of the parish of Bir Miftuħ, in the Middle Ages until the Early Modern period. However on 29 May 1592, it was declared a parish on its own right.

The village had a population of 2,260 people in March 2011. By March 2014 this decreased slightly to 2,191 people.

Places, buildings and structures
In Kirkop, one finds the Menhir monolith, which has become the symbol of the village, and a number of Paleo-Christian Catacombs.

Other notorious buildings and structures are listed monuments which include; the Church of the Annunciation, the Parish Church of St. Leonard, the Chapel St. Nicholas at the cemetery, a cross column (Is-Salib tad-Dejma), and a number of niches scattered around the village. There are two WWII shelters below street level.

There are two band clubs, the St. Leonard Band Club and the St. Joseph Band Club, which are used as recreation.

Kirkop is home to an STMicroelectronics plant, whose production accounts for 60% of national exports.

Kirkop main roads

Triq Ħal Safi (Safi Road)
Triq il-Belt Valletta (Valletta Road)
Triq il-Lewżiet (Almonds Street)
Triq ir-Ramlija (Sandy Street)
Triq It-Tielet Waqgha (Third Fall Road)
Triq l-Industrija (Industry Street)
Triq San Benedittu (St Benedict Street)
Triq l-Gharaq tad-Demm (Bloody Sweat Street)
Triq San Ġwann (St John Street)
Triq San Nikola (St. Nicholas Street)
Triq Santu Rokku (St Rocco Street)
Triq Taż-Żebbiegħ (Taz-Zebbiegh Road)

Band clubs
St Leonard's Band Club (L-Għaqda Mużikali San Leonardu)
St Joseph Band Club  (Soċjetà Mużikali San Ġużepp Ħal Kirkop)

Zones in Ħal Kirkop
Bonu ż-Żgħir
Il-Għadir  (The Lake)
Menħir Estate (Menhir Estate)
Tal-Aħfar
Tal-Ibliq
Tal-Fieres
Tar-Robba
Tas-Sienja

Twin village
The village is twinned with Rousset in France.

References

External links
Ħal Kirkop Local Council
St.Joseph Band Club, Ħal Kirkop

 
Towns in Malta
Local councils of Malta